Hibriten Mountain, located just east of Lenoir, North Carolina, marks the western end of the Brushy Mountains range.  At 2,211 feet, the mountain's summit is nearly 1,000 feet above the surrounding terrain. The summit is well known to the locals for its large welcome light which glows at night in the shape of a star in the weeks before Christmas and a cross before Easter.

A fire tower was erected at the summit in 1927.  It is considered one of the most important fire towers in western North Carolina.

The star/cross light display at the peak was built in 1954.  The star was first shown during the Christmas season of that year, and the cross was first shown during Easter of the following year.

Its geographic and symbolic importance to the area was demonstrated when, in 1966, a new high school was opened at the base of the peak. It was named Hibriten High School in honor of the mountain.

A hang gliding ramp was built at the west end of the mountain top in 1982 by The Buzzard Club.

Hibriten Mountain not only provides a hang gliding location but also a great hiking trail for the community.  There is even an annual race called the Hibriten Hill Run for Children which features a 5k and 10k run.

References

External links 
 http://www.hibritenmountain.com

Mountains of North Carolina
Mountains of Caldwell County, North Carolina
Inselbergs of Piedmont (United States)